Kinross and Western Perthshire by-election may refer to:
1938 Kinross and Western Perthshire by-election
1963 Kinross and Western Perthshire by-election